Brian Uriel Palgrave (born 12 July 1966) is an English former footballer who played as a forward for Alvechurch, Walsall, Port Vale, Nuneaton Borough, Bromsgrove Rovers, and Stafford Rangers.

Career
Palgrave played for Alvechurch (Southern League), before joining Walsall. Alan Buckley's "Saddlers" finished 11th in the Third Division in 1984–85, and then sixth in 1985–86. New boss Tommy Coakley took the club to eighth spot in 1986–87. He scored one goal in eight league games during his time at Fellows Park. He joined John Rudge's Third Division Port Vale on trial in October 1987. His only appearance at Vale Park was as a substitute in a 2–1 win over Exeter City in a preliminary round Football League Trophy match on 26 October. He was released in January 1988 and moved on to Nuneaton Borough, who were struggling near the foot of the Southern League Premier Division; manager Chris Wright signed Bedworth United defender Floyd Peltier on the same day. He made his debut at Manor Park on 16 January, in a 2–1 win over former club Alvechurch. He scored his first goal for "Boro" on 6 February, in a 4–1 home win over Chelmsford City. He scored nine goals from 23 appearances in the second half of the 1987–88 season, but was unable to help the club to keep out of the relegation zone. He scored eight goals from 47 matches in the 1988–89 season, which saw Nuneaton post a fifth-place finish in the Midland Division. He then went the first seven games of the 1989–90 season without scoring and was moved on to Premier Division club Bromsgrove Rovers for a "small fee" after new manager Les Green instigated a clear our of the playing staff. He later played for Stafford Rangers (Conference).

Career statistics
Source:

References

Black British sportsmen
English footballers
Association football forwards
Footballers from Birmingham, West Midlands
Alvechurch F.C. players
Walsall F.C. players
Port Vale F.C. players
Nuneaton Borough F.C. players
Bromsgrove Rovers F.C. players
Stafford Rangers F.C. players
Southern Football League players
English Football League players
National League (English football) players
1966 births
Living people